Mt. Baker Ski Area is a ski resort in the northwest United States, located in Whatcom County, Washington, at the end of State Route 542. Despite its name, the Mt. Baker Ski Area is actually closer to Mount Shuksan than Mount Baker.

The ski area is home to the world's greatest recorded snowfall in one season, during the 1998–99 season.

The ski area is known for numerous challenging in-bounds routes and for the many backcountry opportunities that surround it. The backcountry is accessible from several chairlifts, and access is permitted from the resort following the Mt. Baker Ski Area backcountry policy.

The mountain 

The lifts at Mt. Baker are not named but referred to by number. All are fixed-grip quads. Chairs 3 and 4 access the same point from different sides of the mountain using a continuous loop of cable (haul rope); there is a mid-station at the top for unloading only.

Chair 1 runs from the Heather Meadows Lodge upper base area to the top of Panorama Dome. There is a midpoint station on this lift, where other riders can catch it halfway down the mountain, allowing for speedy runs on Austin, Pan Face, North Face, Chicken Ridge, and the famed Chute. Also accessible from Chair 1 is the Canyon and the rest of the Chair 6 terrain. Chair 2 is located at the Heather Meadows Lodge upper base area. This is a chair for beginners. Chair 3 allows customers either to access the Raven Hut Lodge area or return down to Chairs 2 and 3. Chair 4 runs from the Raven Hut Lodge area and back up to the top of Chair 3. Chair 5 replaced two parallel double chairs and accesses intermediate terrain, as well as the experts-only Gabl's run and the Elbow backcountry area. Chair 6 runs to the top of Panorama Dome. Chair 7 is the only chair that leaves from the White Salmon Lodge base area. From it, one can access Chair 8 or the Raven Hut Lodge area. Chair 8 is the longest chair on the mountain and features longer groomed runs as well as access to the Hemispheres and Shuksan Arm backcountry areas. Additionally, there are two handle-tow surface lifts for beginners, one located at White Salmon and one at Heather Meadows.

As of 2021, Mt. Baker does not have a terrain park.

Possible expansion 
Future expansion is limited, according to an interview with the General Manager, Duncan Howat:

Events

Legendary Banked Slalom 

Started in 1985, this slalom snowboard race through the natural halfpipe has evolved into an international event. The Legendary Banked Slalom attracts many professionals from around the world as competitors and allows amateurs of all ages and abilities to compete on the same course over the same period with the professionals. The winner in each category receives a duct tape trophy and an embroidered Carhartt jacket.

Featured in films 
Mt. Baker Ski Area is often featured in ski and snowboard films and still photography due to its picturesque setting, plentiful snowfall, and the availability of easily accessed advanced terrain. The Call of The Wild was filmed at Mt. Baker in 1934–35.

Featured in Season 5, Episode 14 of the TV series, "Frasier", entitled "The Ski Lodge".

Season and hours 

The ski season typically begins in late November and ends in late April. Usual operating hours are 9:00 a.m. to 3:30 p.m.

History 

1921–26: Mt. Baker highway constructed to Heather Meadows; skiing begins.
1927: Mount Baker Lodge opened. Mt. Baker Ski Club organized.
1930: First ski tournament at Heather Meadows.
1931: Mt. Baker Lodge destroyed by fire.
1935: Pacific Northwest Ski Association downhill tournament, held on northeast face of Table Mountain.
1935–36: "Ski escalator" installed.
1937–38: First rope tow installed, Otto Lang ski school.
1953: The first chairlift, Pan Dome (now Chair 1), is constructed at the ski area.
1977: Six chairs and four rope tows operate. They are referenced by name instead of number.
1981–88: One rope tow (Galena) is removed, and chairs are now numbered instead of named.
1989–90: The first quad chair (Chair 7) is installed in the White Salmon area. One more rope tow (7 Hills) is removed.
1991–98: Chair 8 opens.
1996: White Salmon Day Lodge opens.
2002: Chair 4 and Chair 5 doubles replaced with Chair 5 quad.
2011: Chairs 1 and 6 designated as "Experts only".

References

External links
 
 WSDOT: road conditions
 NOAA Weather Report for Mt. Baker Ski Resort - White Salmon Base Area
 NOAA Weather Report for Mt. Baker Ski Resort - Heather Meadows Base Area
 Northwest Mountain Weather Telemetry Plots - Previous ten days weather
 Ski Map.org – vintage trail maps – Mount Baker ski area
 Live Webcams

Ski areas and resorts in Washington (state)
Tourist attractions in Whatcom County, Washington
Buildings and structures in Whatcom County, Washington